Yoon Bo-mi (born August 13, 1993), better known by the mononym Bomi, is a South Korean singer and actress. She is best known as a member of the South Korean girl group Apink.

Early life and education
Yoon Bo-mi was born in  Suwon, Gyeonggi Province, South Korea on August 13, 1993. She has one older sister, Yoon Sun-mi, and a younger brother, Yoon Jong-jin. She was trained in the martial art of Taekwondo from the age of five and is a holder of a third degree black belt. She attended Youngshin Girls High School and later on, Korean Arts High School; from where she graduated in February 2012. While studying, she decided to put off college to concentrate on music.

Career

2011: Apink
Yoon, along with fellow members, was formally introduced as a member through the group's reality show, Apink News. Yoon debuted with Apink on Mnet's M! Countdown performing their songs "I Don't Know (몰라요; Mollayo)", and "Wishlist" which were included on their debut EP Seven Springs of Apink.

2012–present: Acting career and variety shows
In 2012, Yoon, along with Apink co-member Chorong had a cameo role in the drama Reply 1997, where she portrayed the teenage version of Moon Jeong-mi, the deceased mother of Yoon Yoon-jae.

Yoon was an MC on the variety show Weekly Idol from 17 July 2013 to 8 July 2015. She also joined the cast of the variety show The Human Condition in 2014 and has appeared in MBC's Real Men female special in early 2015.

In September 2015, she was cast in KBS' 10-episode web drama Love Profiler K as top star Yuna, which aired in November on Naver.

In January 2016, Yoon and fellow member Kim Nam-joo became the new MCs of Shikshin Road 2. She then joined the fourth season of We Got Married along with actor Choi Tae-joon who serves as her virtual husband on the show.

In 2017, Yoon was cast in a supporting role in the romantic comedy drama Because This Is My First Life.

In March 2020, Yoon was a lead cast member in the web drama Oppa Will Date Instead. In October, she joined the cast of the drama Please Don't Date Him, which stars Song Ha-yoon and Lee Jun-young. The multi-part drama aired on South Korea's MBC network on November 10, 2020.

Other works
In late 2013, she appeared in K-Hunter's "Marry Me" music video and was featured in hip-hop group M.I.B's song "Let's Talk About You". In 2015, she was featured in David Oh's debut song "I Know, I Know", released on May 11, and on June 16, released a duet with Im Seulong titled "Lovely" for variety show Some Guys, Some Girls. She was later featured in Yoon Hyun-sang's digital single "Let's Eat Together", released on September 24, 2015; she also starred in the music video.

Discography

Singles

Soundtrack appearances

Composition credits
All song credits are adapted from the Korea Music Copyright Association's database unless stated otherwise.

Filmography

Television series

Web series

Television shows

Web shows

Radio shows

Theater

Awards and nominations

Notes

References

External links

 

1993 births
People from Suwon
South Korean women pop singers
South Korean television actresses
Apink members
Living people
Weekly Idol members
IST Entertainment artists
South Korean female idols
South Korean female taekwondo practitioners
21st-century South Korean singers
21st-century South Korean women singers